The Book of Fermoy (aka RIA MS 23 E 29 or the Book of Roche, leabhar de Róiste) is a medieval Irish text dated to the 14th to 16th century AD. The majority of the book consists of a compendium of poems, historical tracts and genealogies related to the medieval Roche family compiled in the 1450s and 1460s.

History
The book was written in the Irish language in the fifteenth century by several scribes. The 238 pages contain numerous tales, histories, and biographies. James Henthorn Todd acquired the work in 1858 - he suggested the title "Book of Roche" would be equally applicable to the work on account of the large quantity of content relating to the history of the Roche Family of Fermoy; one "David [Mór] son of Maurice son of John Roche" is mentioned in the text as a patron of one set of scribes.

Contents
Summary based on Todd (1868). Folio numbering follows Eugene O'Curry's added pagination as in Todd. (a/b refer to each side of the page)

References

Sources

 O'Neill, Timothy. The Irish Hand: Scribes and Their Manuscripts From the Earliest Times. Cork: Cork University Press, 2014.

External links

15th-century books
Early Irish literature
History of County Cork
Irish-language literature
Irish manuscripts